The 1876–77 Birmingham Senior Cup was the first edition of the first football tournament played to Football Association laws, other than the FA Cup, and therefore the first local senior tournament.

Background

The Birmingham Football Association was founded in 1875 and took a subscription of £3 from its member clubs in order to commission a trophy for a member tournament, the trophy costing £50 and made by Mr R Williams of Wednesbury.  Not all of the clubs could afford the £3 subscription - the Harold club for instance only contributing 15s and Wednesbury Old Park 10s 6d.  The bulk of the shortfall was met by the wealthy Calthorpe club, which contributed £7 7s, and Wednesbury Town and West Bromwich contributed £5 5s each.

By 1876, the association had 16 members, with 500-600 members all told, and all clubs entered the competition.

Until 1877, the Association laws did not specify the number of players per side, and it was agreed that the matches would be with 12 players per side.  There was also some local leeway with regard to the laws of the game; in particular, the Birmingham local rules stipulated that "corner" kicks should be taken 20 yards from the goalposts, rather than the corner flag.

Participating teams

Format

The competition was organized as a straight knockout tournament, with replays to a conclusion.

Results

All results as given in History of the Birmingham Senior Cup by Steve Carr unless otherwise stated.

First round

Replays

Second round

Semi-finals

Final

The final was played at Calthorpe's ground on the Bristol Road.  A special train left Wolverhampton at 2.05pm, calling at Wednesbury, West Bromwich, and Hockley, to allow the team members and their friends to travel to the final.  

The Roadsters took a two goal lead in the first half-an-hour of the match, both scored by Crump, but Page shot just under the bar for a goal back shortly before half-time.  Holmes scored two quick goals in the second half, which were enough to secure the trophy for the Old Uns.

Aftermath
Following the formal trophy presentation that evening, the local FA resolved to abolish the "hazardous custom" of charging in local matches, on the basis that it was too dangerous.

References 

Sport in Birmingham, West Midlands
1876–77 in English football